Nordreisa Idrettslag is a Norwegian sports club from Storslett, Troms, founded on 16 September 1946. It has sections for association football, team handball, orienteering, cycling, Nordic skiing, and biathlon.

The men's football team currently plays in the Fifth Division, the sixth tier of Norwegian football. It last played in the Norwegian Second Division in 1999. Former players include Odd-Karl Stangnes, Vegard Braaten and Ruben Kristiansen.

References

  

Football clubs in Norway
Sport in Troms
Association football clubs established in 1946
1946 establishments in Norway